The Kreuz Meckenheim is a cloverleaf interchange that connects the Bundesautobahn 61 (Venlo - Hockenheim) and 565 (Bonn - Gelsdorf) with each other. It is located in the south of the town of Meckenheim in the Rhein-Sieg-Kreis (North Rhine-Westphalia), a small piece on the southeast side is in the area of the neighboring municipality of Graftschaft in the Ahrweiler district (Rhineland-Palatinate).

Design and state of development 
The cross is laid out as a clover leaf with a so-called tangent solution. When those who pass the cross coming from Bonn (A 565) and want to drive on the A 61 in the direction of Koblenz, they must first drive on a direct ramp under the A 565 and then over the A 61 before continuing on the A 61 can.

Both motorways have four lanes at the intersection.

Near the motorway junction, the motorways are linked to the B 257 in the direction of Altenahr - upper Ahr Valley and the former B 266 in the direction of Rheinbach and the lower Ahr valley. The A 565 goes south-west directly into the B 257, the Gelsdorf junction of the A 565 leads to the B 266 not far from the motorway junction.

Traffiic near the interchange

External links 

Meckenheim
Roads in North Rhine-Westphalia